Rostov-Glavny is the main railway station of Rostov-on-Don in Russia.

Main information
Rostov station is one of the biggest stations on the North Caucasus Railway. The station also includes commuter rail station Rostov-Prigorodniy opened in 1962 and rebuilt in 2009.

History 

In 1869 Kursk–Kharkiv–Azov railways (now Southern Ukrainian Railways) reached Rostov-on-Don from the west. In 1876 another railways – Kozlov–Voronezh–Rostov – reached Rostov-on-Don from the north. At this time two stations on the bank of the river Don – Rostov and Nakhichevan-on-Don – were closed, and on Kozlov–Voronezh–Rostov railways was opened station Nakhichevan, that in the present is called "Rostov-Tovarniy".

In 1875 the construction of the three-storeyed building of the station Rostov–Vladikavkazskiy (Rostov–Glavniy) was completed. For that time, it was a modern station with good prospects for future growth. On 15 January 1876 Rostov–Glavniy was officially opened. The station building had been rebuilt many times. For example, during World War II in the autumn of 1941 the station building was destroyed by bombing and then restored.

By the end of the 1970s the building was pulled down for the construction of the new station with high-rise hotel towers. By the early 1990s the construction of a complex of additional buildings was over. And in 2000 the reconstruction of the main building began. It was completed in 2004.

In 2006 some long-distance trains were moved to the new station in the western part of the city – Rostov–Pervomayskiy.

References

External links
 Photos
 Train times on Yandex
 Train times on RZD.ru

Buildings and structures in Rostov-on-Don
Railway stations in the Russian Empire opened in 1869
1869 establishments in the Russian Empire
Railway stations in Rostov Oblast
Transport in Rostov-on-Don